Joshua Uche (born September 18, 1998) is an American football linebacker for the New England Patriots of the National Football League (NFL). He played college football at Michigan.

Early years
Uche was born in 1998, the son of Nigerian immigrants, and grew up in Miami, Florida. He attended Christopher Columbus High School in Miami.

College career
Uche attended the University of Michigan on a football scholarship. As a freshman in 2016, Uche tore his meniscus, caught a "bad virus" and appeared in only four games. As a sophomore in 2017, he sustained a stress fracture and saw limited action in 10 games. After the 2017 season, Uche was frustrated with his lack of playing time.  He recalled: "I just felt like I was useless at the time. It was just frustrating to me because I wanted to be out there with my teammates, helping, contributing and doing something to just help the team win. When I wouldn't be able to do that, I just questioned if this was the right fit for me." Uche met with defensive coordinator Don Brown to express his frustration and ask for more playing time in 2018. Brown replied: "Well go earn it, how about that? How about go earn it?"

As a junior in 2018, Uche appeared in 12 games at linebacker. He had eight tackles for loss and led the team with seven sacks. In November 2018, the Detroit Free Press described him as "the most surprising player on the nation's top-ranked defense." Michigan head coach Jim Harbaugh described Uche as "highly determined and motivated. He's a really special player as well." At the end of the 2018 season, he received honorable mention from both the coaches and media on the 2018 All-Big Ten Conference football team.

During the 2019 season, Uche recorded a career-high 34 tackles, including 23 solo stops. His 11.5 tackles for loss were second-most on the team, while his 8.5 sacks led the team. Uche's 8.5 sacks was tied for 14th most in a single season in Michigan program history. Following the season, Uche was named to the 2019 All-Big Ten defensive second-team by the coaches. It was announced that Uche would forgo his final year of eligibility and declare for the 2020 NFL Draft. His final amateur game was the 2020 Senior Bowl.

Professional career

Uche was selected with the 60th pick in the 2020 NFL Draft by the New England Patriots. Uche was the second (of three) Michigan linebackers the Patriots drafted in consecutive years, following Chase Winovich and preceding Cameron McGrone. He was placed on injured reserve on September 26, 2020 with a foot injury. He was activated on October 31.
 
In Week 10 against the Baltimore Ravens on Sunday Night Football, Uche recorded his first career sack on Lamar Jackson during the 23–17 win. On December 31, 2020, Uche was placed on injured reserve.

Uche entered the 2021 season as a rotational outside linebacker and pass rusher for the Patriots. He was placed on injured reserve on November 17, 2021. He was activated on December 25.

Uche had a breakout year in 2022. Starting off slow, Uche got his first sack of the season in Week 8, then followed it up with a three-sack performance against the Colts in Week 9. In Week 14, had five tackles, three sacks, and three tackles for loss in a 27-13 win over the Cardinals, earning AFC Defensive Player of the Week. He finished the season second on the team with 11.5 sacks, along with 27 tackles and two forced fumbles through 15 games.

References

External links
 Michigan bio

1998 births
Living people
American football linebackers
Michigan Wolverines football players
Christopher Columbus High School (Miami-Dade County, Florida) alumni
Players of American football from Miami
American sportspeople of Nigerian descent
New England Patriots players